Czamanske Ridge is a ridge between Jaeger Table and Welcome Pass in the Dufek Massif of the Pensacola Mountains. It was named by the Advisory Committee on Antarctic Names after Gerald K. Czamanske, a United States Geological Survey (USGS) geologist and a member of the USGS Pensacola Mountains party, 1976–77.

References
 

Ridges of Queen Elizabeth Land